Kevin Muller (born April 22, 1987) is a Puerto Rican international soccer player who plays college soccer for Stony Brook University as a defender.

External links

Caribbean Football Database
Stony Brook University

1987 births
Living people
Puerto Rican footballers
Puerto Rico international footballers
Stony Brook Seawolves men's soccer players
People from Bay Shore, New York
Sportspeople from Suffolk County, New York
Association football defenders
LIU Sharks men's soccer players